Deontay Wilder vs. Luis Ortiz II was a professional boxing rematch between defending WBC heavyweight champion Deontay Wilder and the challenger, former WBA interim heavyweight champion, Luis Ortiz. The fight took place on November 23, 2019 at the MGM Grand Garden Arena in Las Vegas, Nevada. Wilder defeated Ortiz via seventh-round knockout to retain the WBC title.

Fight card

Broadcasting 
The fight was televised on PPV's Fox in the United States.

See also 

 Deontay Wilder vs. Luis Ortiz

References 

World Boxing Council heavyweight championship matches
Boxing in Las Vegas
2019 in boxing
MGM Grand Garden Arena
2019 in sports in Nevada
November 2019 sports events in the United States